Grank or GRANK may refer to:

 GRANK, a ranking of rarity of species
 Grank (Guardians of Ga'Hoole), a fictional character

See also 
 Grunk (disambiguation)